Tomoko Tamura is a former international table tennis player from Japan.

Table tennis career
She won a silver medal for Japan at the 1983 World Table Tennis Championships in the Corbillon Cup (women's team event) with Mika Hoshino, Fumiko Shinpo and Emiko Kanda.

See also
 List of World Table Tennis Championships medalists

References

Japanese female table tennis players
World Table Tennis Championships medalists